The Amblypodiini are a small tribe of butterflies in the family Lycaenidae.

Genera

As not all Theclinae have been assigned to tribes, the following list of genera is preliminary:

 Amblypodia
 Iraota
 Myrina

 
Theclinae
Butterfly tribes